Jimmy Gavin (born August 28, 1991) is an American basketball player for Szolnoki Olajbányász of the Hungarian first division.

Early career
Gavin played on his high school team in his freshman and sophomore year, but was unable to complete his sophomore year after he was diagnosed with Chrone's disease.

College career 
Gavin enrolled at Mississippi State University as a regular student focused on academics. In the spring of 2011, he left the university to return home after his younger brother was killed in a car crash.

The following year he joined the varsity team of Bradley, before transferring to the Wisconsin–Parkside Rangers in 2013. In two seasons, he scored 1,004 points in the NCAA Division II. As a senior he averaged 17.4 points and as named to the GLVC All-First Team.

In his final college season, he played in the Division I for Winthrop, averaging 18.7 points per game.

Professional career
Gavin started his career with Dzūkija of the Lithuanian Basketball League (LKL). Prior, he was invited for the 2016 NBA Summer League to play for the Orlando Magic.

On November 12, 2021, Gavin signed with Donar of the BNXT League. On May 20, 2022, he won the Dutch Basketball Cup with Donar, contributing with a team-high of 15 points in the final.

Awards and accomplishments

Club
Donar
Dutch Cup: (2022)

Individual
All-Big South First Team: (2016)
Big South All-Tournament Team: (2016)
GLVC All-First Team: (2015)
GLVC All-Second Team: (2014)
NABC All-District Midwest Second Team: (2015)

References

External links

1991 births
BC Dzūkija players
Living people
Bradley Braves men's basketball players
Donar (basketball club) players
American expatriate basketball people in Bulgaria
American expatriate basketball people in Greece
American expatriate basketball people in the Netherlands
American expatriate basketball people in Russia
American expatriate basketball people in Poland
American expatriate basketball people in Lithuania
American expatriate basketball people in Turkey
American expatriate basketball people in Bosnia and Herzegovina
American men's basketball players
Winthrop Eagles men's basketball players
BC Spartak Saint Petersburg players
KK Igokea players
Point guards